Jase McClellan (born June 25, 2002) is an American football running back for the Alabama Crimson Tide.

High school career
McClellan attended Aledo High School in Aledo, Texas. During his career, he had 6,468 yards rushing yards and 122 touchdowns. He was selected to play in the 2020 Under Armour All-American Game. He originally committed to the University of Oklahoma to play college football before changing his commitment to the University of Alabama.

College career
As a true freshman at Alabama in 2020, McClellan rushed 23 times for 245 yards and two touchdowns. As a junior in 2021, he played in five games before tearing his ACL, which ended his season. He finished the year with 40 carries for 191 yards and a touchdown. McClellan returned from the ACL injury to start the 2022 season.

References

External links
Alabama Crimson Tide bio

Living people
Players of American football from Texas
American football running backs
Alabama Crimson Tide football players
2002 births